The Jordan River Dam, officially the Jordan River Diversion Dam, and known locally simply as Diversion Dam, is a dam located in Jordan River, British Columbia, Canada.  It is part of the second hydroelectric development on Vancouver Island.

History

Prior to the dam's construction, the Goldstream Powerhouse was the main source of electricity to Victoria. Upon completion, it dwarfed the previous plant.

The Vancouver Island Power Company, a subsidiary of British Columbia Electric Railway, completed construction of the smaller Bear Creek Dam and the main Jordan River Diversion Dam in 1911. At  from top to bottom, the Diversion Dam was upon its construction, the highest dam in Canada. Water flowed through a 31,600 ft long flume to the penstock above the power house. The construction of the dam, due to its remoteness, required the construction of a three-foot narrow gauge railway as well as a cable-railway for the initial ascent from Jordan River.
From 1912 to 1931 continual improvements and additional generators pushed the capacity of the power house to 26 megawatts.

In 1971 the flume was replaced by a 7 km tunnel, with a penstock flowing down to a new power house, located across the river from the original. The same year, the accompanying service railway was also dismantled. A Japanese built generator replaced the old equipment, boosting power output from 26 megawatts to 175 megawatts.

Current operation
It provides 35% of Vancouver Island's generating capacity.

In 1996, the provincial government initiated a Water Use Planning (WUP) program, demanding that BC's water licence holders show they can manage the potential environmental impact of reservoirs. in 2001 the Jordan River "WUP" was underway, with restoration of fish habitat a top issue.

A 2014 BC Hydro study indicated Jordan River had a high risk of seismic dam failure. BC Hydro has offered to purchase the nine residences in the evacuation zone.

See also

 HVDC Vancouver Island
 Powerlines connecting Vancouver Island with Canadian Mainland
 List of generating stations in BC
 List of dams and reservoirs in Canada
Lubbe Powerhouse

References

External links
aerial image of the project, BC Hydro webpage
Aerial image of the powerhouse, BC Hydro webpage

Dams in British Columbia
Hydroelectric power stations in British Columbia
Juan de Fuca region
Dams completed in 1911
1911 establishments in British Columbia
BC Hydro
Publicly owned dams in Canada